The 2017 Champions Indoor Football season was the third season of the CIF. It started on February 25, when the Omaha Beef traveled to Iowa, losing to the Sioux City Bandits 63–44. The regular season concluded on Saturday, June 3. This was the first season in which four teams per conference advanced to the Champions Bowl playoffs, with the top seed in each conference hosting their conference's fourth seed, and second seeds hosting third seeds in the first round.

The league champion was the Texas Revolution, who defeated the Beef 59–49 in Champions Bowl III. The season MVP was Duke City Gladiators quarterback Donovan Porterie, and the Champions Bowl MVP was Revolution wide receiver Clinton Solomon.

League changes

Standings

Dodge City Law video controversy
On June 2, 2017, the league stripped the Dodge City Law of two victories without awarding them to any other team. Reports from other teams and a subsequent investigation found that the Law were in violation of the league's operations manual and guidelines on uploading video. As their final game of the season did not start at the time, the Law's record went from 9–2 to 7–4. When asked about the decision, commissioner Ricky Bertz stated, "While this situation was unfortunate and no one in the CIF including the Dodge City Law wanted this to be the final outcome, the board of directors decided that this was what was best for the league given the circumstances and how they related to all team members involved."

Playoffs

Awards

Players of the week
The following were named the top performers during the 2017 season:

Individual season awards

All-CIF Team

All-Conference Teams

First Team Northern

Second Team Northern

First Team Southern

Second Team Southern

References